Steinmaur railway station is a railway station in the municipality of Steinmaur, in the Swiss canton of Zürich. It is an intermediate stop on the standard gauge Wehntal line of Swiss Federal Railways.

Services 
The following services stop at Steinmaur:

References

External links 
 
 

Railway stations in the canton of Zürich
Swiss Federal Railways stations